Nothing Less Than a Real Man (Spanish: Nada menos que todo un hombre) is a 1972 Spanish drama film directed by Rafael Gil and starring Analía Gadé, Francisco Rabal and Ángel del Pozo. It is based on Miguel de Unamuno's 1916 novel of the same name.

Cast
Analía Gadé as Julia Yáñez  
Francisco Rabal as Alejandro Gómez 
Ángel del Pozo as Gabriel  
José María Seoane 
Tomás Blanco as Víctor Yáñez, Julia's father
 as Julia's mother 
 as Berta  
Rafael Hernández as Encargado casa del campo  

 as Don Rosendo  
José Franco as priest  
Jesús Guzmán as notary
 as Socio del Casino  
Manuel Tejada as Julia's suitor 
Ricardo Tundidor as Enrique  

Vicente Roca 
Rosa Fontana 
Bárbara Lis 

Antonio Cintado as Gustavo 
Ángel Menéndez
Carmen Martínez Sierra as Mujer en la iglesia  
Ricardo Palacios as Socio del casino

References

External links

1972 drama films
Spanish drama films
Films directed by Rafael Gil
1970s Spanish-language films
1970s Spanish films